The Spirit of Gallipoli is a 1928 silent Australian film. Originally running at 5,000 feet length only 1,554 feet survive.

Plot
A rebellious young man, Billy Austin, is conscripted into the Australian Army. Initially an unwilling soldier, he eventually becomes a good one, and dreams of serving with the ANZACs at Gallipoli.  He eventually leaves the army, gets married and settles down on a farm.

Cast
Keith Gategood as Billy Austin
William Green as Jack Thomas
Samuel Harris as William Austin
Gwen Sherwood as Mrs Austin
Marie Miller as Gladys Merton

Production
The film was made by two young army trainees of the 55th Battalion with a cast of amateurs in early 1928. It was a propaganda piece to promote the role of the army in peacetime. Army co-operation meant enabled several scenes to be shot at Liverpool camp.

The footage of the Gallipoli dream sequence is taken from the silent movie The Hero of the Dardanelles (1915).

Release
Commercial reception appears to have been limited.

References

External links

The Spirit of Gallipoli at National Film and Sound Archive

1928 films
Australian silent feature films
Lost Australian films
Australian black-and-white films